William George Searle (1829–1913) was a 19th-century British historian and a fellow of Queens' College, Cambridge. 

His works include Ingulf and the Historia Croylandensis, Onomasticon Anglo-Saxonicum: A List of Anglo-Saxon Proper  Names from the Time of Beda to that of King John and Anglo-Saxon Bishops, Kings and Nobles.  He also published a history of Queens' College.

He was the father of the physicist George Frederick Charles Searle.

References

External links
 

19th-century English historians
Fellows of Queens' College, Cambridge
1829 births
Place of birth missing
1913 deaths
Place of death missing